Social Salvation started as an 1898 series of films and slides produced by the Limelight Department of the Salvation Army in Australia. It was directed by Herbert Booth, who would present the films while lecturing. By 1900 it had evolved to a series of 25 one minute films and 275 slides.

It has been acclaimed as the first Australian narrative film on social work.

References

External links

1890s Australian films
Australian short documentary films
The Salvation Army
1898 films
Australian silent short films
Australian black-and-white films
Limelight Department films
1890s short documentary films